Fivos Constantinou (born May 27, 1981) is a Cyprus Native and holds undergraduate and graduate degrees in Computer Science from MIT. Fivos is well known for his accomplishments as a distance runner on the track as well as in Cross Country. He has competed for the MIT Cross Country and Indoor and Outdoor Track and Field Teams. In his senior year he was the Cross Country team captain and was voted as the team's MVP by the team members.

Prior to his collegiate career Fivos competed for his local track club in Cyprus, G.S.Z., and was a 4 time National champion. 
He won National titles in 800m and 1500m races as well as 2 Cross Country titles.

Personal Bests 
"(xc)" indicates Cross Country 
"(i)" indicates Indoor Track

References

External links
 Fivos' Training Log
 MIT Men's Track and Field & Cross Country
 Profile at the European Athletics Association

1981 births
Living people